Pavel Ryzhevski (born 3 March 1981) is a Belarusian footballer, who currently plays for BFC Daugavpils in the Virsliga.

Ryzhevski previously played for Dinaburg FC. Through the 2008 season, Ryzhevski had made 125 appearances and scored 26 goals in the Latvian Higher League.

In the 2012 season Ryzhevski scored 26 goals in 22 matches for Ilūkstes NSS, helping the team clinch a promotion to the Latvian Higher League. He was the top scorer of the Latvian First League and was also named the best player of the Latvian First League in 2012 by the Latvian Football Federation. Despite his effectiveness, Ryzhevski left the club after the season due to professional reasons.

In April 2013 it was announced that Ryzhevski would continue playing in the Latvian First League, joining BFC Daugavpils.

Honours
Skonto Riga
Latvian Higher League champion: 2002, 2003
Latvian Football Cup winner: 2002

Playing career

* - played games and goals

References

1981 births
Living people
Belarusian footballers
Belarusian expatriate footballers
Expatriate footballers in Latvia
Belarusian expatriate sportspeople in Latvia
Belarusian expatriate sportspeople in Kazakhstan
Expatriate footballers in Kazakhstan
Belarusian Premier League players
Latvian Higher League players
Kazakhstan Premier League players
FC Molodechno players
Skonto FC players
Dinaburg FC players
FC Tobol players
FC Dynamo Brest players
SK Blāzma players
BFC Daugavpils players
Ilūkstes NSS players
Association football forwards